Ütämeşgäräy (pronounced , also spelled Utamish, Ütämeş, Ötemiş Giray, Utyamysh; frequently anglicized as Ötemish Giray via Crimean Tatar) (1546–1566) was a Khan of the Kazan Khanate from 1549-1551. He was the son of Safagäräy and Söyembikä. Upon his father's death he was crowned Khan at the age of two with his mother serving as regent. Ivan the Terrible took advantage of this situation and sent an army which besieged Kazan in February 1550. An early thaw caused Ivan to pull back  and build the fort of Sviyazhsk from which his army raided the surrounding country. The peace faction in Kazan came to power and accepted the Russian candidate Shah Ali as khan, turning over Utameshgaray and his mother to the Russians. Shortly after this, the patriotic faction regained power, expelled Shah Ali and brought in Yadegar Mokhammad of Kazan who was khan when the Russians conquered Kazan in 1552.

In January, 1553 Utameshgaray was baptized as a Christian, taking the name Alexander. He died at the age of 20 and is buried in Moscow. His mother was later married to Shah Ali.

See also
 List of Kazan khans

References
Henry Hoyle Howorth, History of the Mongols, 1880, Part 2, pp 405-409

1546 births
1566 deaths
Khanate of Kazan
Converts to Eastern Orthodoxy from Islam
16th-century monarchs in Europe
Russian former Muslims
Tatar Christians